Vito Claudio Crimi (born 26 April 1972) is an Italian politician, member of the Five Star Movement, of which he was appointed acting leader on 22 January 2020. Since 2013, he has been a serving member of the Italian Senate.

Biography
Vito Crimi was born in Palermo, Sicily, in 1972. He grew up in the Brancaccio district; he enrolled in a degree course in mathematics at the University of Palermo, without completing his studies. In 2000 he moved to Brescia where he worked as a court clerk at the Appellate court.

In 2007 he joined the Friends of Beppe Grillo Meetup in Brescia. He was candidate for president with the Five Star Movement in the 2010 Lombard regional election, but obtained only 3% of the preferences.

In 2013 he was elected Senator in the Lombardy constituency, and from 19 March to 16 June he was chairman of the parliamentary group of the Five Star Movement in the Senate. He was re-elected Senator in 2018 and served as Undersecretary of State for the Presidency of the Council of Ministers with responsibility for publishing in the Conte I Cabinet.

On 13 September 2019, he was appointed Deputy Minister of the Interior in the second government of Giuseppe Conte.

References

1972 births
Living people
Five Star Movement politicians
Politicians from Palermo
Senators of Legislature XVII of Italy
Senators of Legislature XVIII of Italy
20th-century Italian people
21st-century Italian politicians